Oktyabrsky is a rural locality (a selo) and the administrative center of Oktyabrsky Selsoviet of Zeysky District, Amur Oblast, Russia. The population was 1,044 as of 2018. There are 37 streets.

Geography 
Yasny is the nearest rural locality.

References 

Rural localities in Zeysky District